, also known as KUTV (Kochi UHF TeleVision), is a television network headquartered in Kōchi Prefecture, Japan.  It is affiliated with Japan News Network (JNN).  TV Kochi founded in 1969, and started broadcasting in 1970. 

KUTV started digital terrestrial television broadcasting in 2006, and ended analog television broadcasting in 2011.  In 2015, KUTV re-build its headquarter building.

References

External links
 Official website 

Japan News Network
Television stations in Japan
Television channels and stations established in 1969
Companies based in Kōchi Prefecture